The Ferrari Purosangue (Type F175) is a high-performance SUV by Italian automobile manufacturer Ferrari that was introduced on 13 September 2022. It is Ferrari's first SUV and production 4-door vehicle.

Name
The Ferrari Purosangue is named after the horse breed. In 2020, Ferrari attempted to trademark the 'Purosangue' moniker, however an organization, the Purosangue Foundation, blocked Ferrari from trademarking the name, and as a result the automaker filed a lawsuit against the organization for naming rights which went to court on March 5.

Development
Development of a Ferrari SUV codenamed F175 began in 2017 and was hinted at by then-Ferrari CEO Sergio Marchionne, and was later officially confirmed in September 2018. The Purosangue  was revealed on 13 September 2022 for the 2023 model year.

Spy shots of a Ferrari Purosangue test mule first appeared on the internet on 22 October 2018, with the prototype using a Ferrari GTC4Lusso. The Ferrari Purosangue appeared in leaked images in February 2022. A month later, Ferrari revealed a partial image of the Purosangue.

Overview
The Purosangue will be based on the same platform as the Ferrari Roma coupe and will use fastback styling.

The Ferrari Purosangue competes with other high-performance SUVs such as the Lamborghini Urus and Aston Martin DBX.

The SUV will use an eight-speed dual-clutch automatic transmission.

The power peaks at 7750 rpm and the torque peak sits at 6250 rpm. All-wheel steering is standard.

The Purosangue also has front-opening rear doors and a B-pillar. This configuration aids ingress and egress to the rear seat.

References

Cars introduced in 2022
Purosangue
2020s cars
Luxury sport utility vehicles
Plug-in hybrid vehicles
Hybrid electric cars

Vehicles with four-wheel steering